Madhubahashini Disanayaka Ratnayaka is a Sri Lankan academic and author. Her novel There is Something I Have to Tell You won the Gratiaen Prize in 2011. She is the Head of English Language at the University of Sri Jayewardenepura.

Early life
Madhubahashini Disanayaka Ratnayake is the daughter of Professor Emeritus J. B. Disanayaka. She was educated at Ladies' College, Colombo and went on to gain a  BA at the University of Allahabad and won a Fulbright scholarship to study for a Masters in American and English Literature at the New York University.

Works
The works she has authored include;

Novels
 There is Something I have to Tell You

Short stories 
 Driftwood 
 Tales of Shades and Shadow
 A strange Tale of Love

Radio plays
 Voices from Afar

Children's stories
 Raththa
 Animal Tales

Non fiction
 Contemporary Sinhala Fiction

Awards and honors
2011: Gratiaen Prize, winner, There is Something I have to Tell You 
2004: Gratiaen Prize, short-list, A strange Tale of Love 
2001: Gratiaen Prize, short-list, Tales of Shades and Shadow 
1990: State Literary Award, Best Collection of Short Stories in English, Driftwood

References

 The Gratiaen Prize 2011 - Shortlisted Authors

Living people
Sri Lankan novelists
Sinhalese academics
English-language writers from Sri Lanka
New York University alumni
University of Allahabad alumni
Alumni of Ladies' College, Colombo
Year of birth missing (living people)
Sri Lankan women academics
Sri Lankan expatriates in the United States